Kwame Pelé Frimpong (born  professional footballer,

Career
Frimpong previously played for Greek clubs Ilisiakos F.C., Chaidari F.C., Kalamata F.C. and Marko F.C. In January 2012, Frimpong transferred from Egaleo F.C. to Ghana top-flight club Ebusua Dwarfs for an undisclosed fee.

International career
Frimpong played for the Ghana national under-17 football team in the 1999 FIFA U-17 World Championship in New Zealand.

References 

1983 births
Living people
Ghanaian footballers
Association football forwards
Marko F.C. players
Kalamata F.C. players
Chaidari F.C. players
Ilisiakos F.C. players
Egaleo F.C. players
Ghanaian expatriate footballers
Panathinaikos F.C. players
Expatriate footballers in Greece
Ghanaian expatriate sportspeople in Greece